The Continental O-470 engine is a family of carbureted and fuel-injected six-cylinder, horizontally opposed, air-cooled aircraft engines that was developed especially for use in light aircraft by Continental Motors.  Engines designated "IO" are fuel-injected.

The family also includes the E165, E185, E225 and the E260 engines, and several specialty variants. It has been in production since 1950.

Design and development
The first engine in this series was the E165, a 471 cubic inch (7.7 L) engine producing , and was the first of the Continental's "E" series engines. Later versions were given the company designation of E185 ( continuous) and E225. When the US military gave them all the designation of O-470 the company adopted the designation and future models were known as Continental O-470s.

The engines were developed in the late 1940s and certification was applied for on 23 October 1950 on the regulatory basis of Part 13 of the US Civil Air Regulations effective 1 August 1949 as amended by 13-1. The first O-470 model was certified on 19 January 1951.

Variants

Carbureted models
E165-2
 at 2050 rpm, dry weight , Marvel-Schebler MA-4-5 carburetor.
E165-3
 at 2050 rpm, dry weight , Bendix-Stromberg PS-5C or PS-5CD carburetor.
E165-4
 at 2050 rpm, dry weight , Bendix-Stromberg PS-5C or PS-5CD carburetor.
E185-1
 at 2600 rpm for five minutes,  at 2300 rpm continuous, dry weight , Bendix-Stromberg PS-5C or PS-5CD carburetor.
E185-2
 at 2300 rpm, dry weight , Marvel-Schebler MA-4-5 carburetor.
E185-3
 at 2600 rpm for five minutes,  at 2300 rpm continuous, dry weight , Bendix-Stromberg PS-5C or PS-5CD carburetor.
E185-5
 at 2300 rpm, dry weight , Bendix-Stromberg PS-5C or PS-5CD carburetor.
E185-8
 at 2600 rpm for five minutes,  at 2300 rpm continuous, dry weight , Bendix-Stromberg PS-5C or PS-5CD carburetor, identical to E185-1 but with revised starter drive with dog rather than gear type starter.
E185-9
 at 2600 rpm for five minutes,  at 2300 rpm continuous, dry weight , Bendix-Stromberg PS-5C or PS-5CD carburetor, identical to E185-3 except for revised starter drive to accommodate dog rather than gear type starter.
E185-10
 at 2600 rpm for five minutes,  at 2300 rpm continuous, dry weight , Bendix-Stromberg PS-5C or PS-5CD carburetor.
E185-11
 at 2600 rpm for five minutes,  at 2300 rpm continuous, dry weight , Bendix-Stromberg PS-5C or PS-5CD carburetor, identical to E185-8 but with revised mounting brackets.
E225-2
 at 2650 rpm, dry weight . Certified 19 July 1951.
E225-4
 at 2650 rpm, dry weight . Certified 5 July 1952.
E225-8
 at 2650 rpm, dry weight . Certified 12 July 1950.
E225-9
 at 2650 rpm, dry weight . Certified 30 October 1950.
GE260-2X
, flown in the Robertson Skylark SRX-1
O-470-2
 at 2600 rpm, dry weight , supercharged model. Certified 2 February 1955.
O-470-4
 at 2600 rpm, dry weight , previously designated 0-470-13B. It is identical to the Model 0-470-13A except for the Bendix-Stromberg Model PS-5CD carburetor in place of the PS-5C. Certified 19 January 1951.
O-470-7
Non-certified military engine, identical to E185-3,  at 2600 rpm, dry weight , Bendix-Stromberg PS-5C or PS-5CD carburetor. When equipped with 18 mm. spark plugs, it is designated 0-470-7A.
O-470-11
 at 2600 rpm, dry weight , two sixth order dampers. Certified 19 January 1951.
O-470-11B
 at 2600 rpm, dry weight , identical to the 0-470-11 but with 0-470-15 cylinders and pistons. Certified 19 January 1951.
O-470-13
 at 2600 rpm, dry weight , one fifth and one sixth order dampers or two sixth order dampers. Certified 19 January 1951.
O-470-13A
 at 2600 rpm, dry weight , identical to the 0-470-13 but with an additional tachometer drive through the camshaft gear and one fifth and one sixth order crankshaft damper. Certified 19 January 1951.
O-470-15
 at 2600 rpm, dry weight , identical to the 0-470-11 except: four sixth order damper crankshaft, propeller control provisions, revised engine mounting brackets and long skirt pistons. Certified 19 January 1951.
O-470-A
 at 2600 rpm, dry weight . Certified 4 December 1952.

 at 2600 rpm, dry weight , similar to O-470-A except increased power, different damper configuration, incorporation of inclined valve cylinders, downdraft pressure carburetor and induction changes. Identical to E185-9. Certified 4 December 1952.
O-470-E
 at 2600 rpm, dry weight , same as O-470-A except downdraft pressure carburetor. Certified 4 December 1952.
O-470-G
 at 2600 rpm, dry weight , similar to O-470-M except crankshaft damper configuration, revised oil sump integral cast intake air passage and mounting brackets. Certified 4 December 1952.
O-470-H
 at 2600 rpm, dry weight , same as O-470-B with an extension propeller shaft, approved for pusher installations. Certified 4 December 1952.
O-470-J
 at 2550 rpm, dry weight , same as O-470-A except reduced max rpm and induction system risers, manifold and balance tube. Certified 4 December 1952.
O-470-K
 at 2600 rpm, dry weight , similar to O-470-J except max rpm, crankshaft damper configuration, incorporation of shell-molded cylinder heads and revised mounting brackets. Certified 4 December 1952.
O-470-L
 at 2600 rpm, dry weight , same as O-470-K except relocated carburetor, revised intake manifold oil sump. Certified 4 December 1952.
O-470-M
 at 2600 rpm, dry weight , same as O-470-B except crankshaft damper configuration and incorporation of shell-molded cylinder heads. Certified 4 December 1952.
O-470-N
 at 2600 rpm, dry weight , same as O-470-M except crankshaft damper configuration. Certified 4 December 1952.
O-470-P
 at 2600 rpm, dry weight , identical to O-470-G except crankshaft damper configuration. Certified 4 December 1952.
O-470-R
 at 2600 rpm, dry weight , same as O-470-L except crankshaft damper configuration. Certified 4 December 1952.
O-470-S
 at 2600 rpm, dry weight , same as O-470-R except piston oil cooling and semi-keystone piston rings. Certified 4 December 1952.
O-470-T
 at 2400 rpm, dry weight , similar to the O-470-S except crankcase design and max rpm. Certified 4 December 1952.
O-470-U
 at 2400 rpm, dry weight , similar to the O-470-S except max rpm rating and crankshaft damper configuration. Certified 4 December 1952.

Fuel-injected models
IO-470-A
 at 2600 rpm, dry weight , equipped with a TCM 5580 fuel injector. Certified 4 December 1952.
IO-470-C
 at 2600 rpm, dry weight , equipped with a TCM 5620 or 5827 fuel injector. Certified 4 December 1952.
IO-470-D
 at 2625 rpm, dry weight , equipped with a TCM 5648, 5808 or 5832 fuel injector. Certified 14 October 1958.
IO-470-E
 at 2625 rpm, dry weight , equipped with a TCM 5648, 5808 or 5832 fuel injector. Certified 26 November 1958.
IO-470-F
 at 2625 rpm, dry weight , equipped with a TCM 5648, 5808 or 5832 fuel injector. Certified 3 December 1958.
IO-470-G
 at 2600 rpm, dry weight , equipped with a TCM 5648, 5808 or 5832 fuel injector. Certified 30 March 1959.
IO-470-H
 at 2625 rpm, dry weight , equipped with a TCM 5620-2 fuel injector. Certified 7 August 1959.
IO-470-J
 at 2600 rpm, dry weight , equipped with a TCM 5612-1 fuel injector. Certified 31 July 1959.
IO-470-K
 at 2600 rpm, dry weight , equipped with a TCM 5807 fuel injector. Certified 9 June 1960.
IO-470-L
 at 2625 rpm, dry weight , equipped with a TCM 5648, 5808 or 5832 fuel injector. Certified 9 March 1960.
IO-470-LO
 at 2625 rpm, dry weight , equipped with a TCM 5648, 5808 or 5832 fuel injector. Certified 26 September 1967.
IO-470-M
 at 2625 rpm, dry weight , equipped with a TCM 5648, 5808 or 5832 fuel injector. Certified 10 March 1960.
IO-470-N
 at 2625 rpm, dry weight , equipped with a TCM 5830 fuel injector. Certified 9 June 1960.
IO-470-P
 at 2600 rpm, dry weight , equipped with a TCM 5648 fuel injector. Certified 31 March 1961.
IO-470-R
 at 2600 rpm, dry weight , equipped with a TCM 5648, 5808 or 5832 fuel injector. Certified 7 October 1960.
IO-470-S
 at 2625 rpm, dry weight , equipped with a TCM 5648, 5808 or 5832 fuel injector. Certified 10 May 1961.
IO-470-T
 at 2600 rpm, dry weight , equipped with a TCM 5648 fuel injector. Certified 1 July 1963.
IO-470-U
 at 2625 rpm, dry weight , equipped with a TCM 5648, 5808 or 5832 fuel injector. Certified 28 August 1963.
IO-470-V
 at 2625 rpm, dry weight , equipped with a TCM 5648, 5808 or 5832 fuel injector. Certified 15 June 1965.
IO-470-VO
 at 2625 rpm, dry weight , equipped with a TCM 5648, 5808 or 5832 fuel injector. Certified 26 September 1967.
GIO-470-A
TSIO-470-B
LIO-470-A
 at 2600 rpm, dry weight , equipped with a TCM 6022 fuel injector. The same as an IO-470-T, except that the crankshaft turns in opposite direction for use on twin-engined aircraft. Certified 18 March 1964.
FSO-470-A
 at 3000 rpm, dry weight , Supercharged model, specifically approved for helicopters. Certified 2 February 1955.

Applications

E165
Boisavia Mercurey
Luscombe 11

E185
Beechcraft Bonanza
Macchi M.B.320
Muniz Casmuniz 52
Ryan Navion

E225
Beechcraft Bonanza
Beechcraft T-34 Mentor
Fletcher FD-25
Fletcher FL-23
Ryan Navion

E260
 Robertson SRX-1 Skyshark

O-470
Associated Air Liberty 181
Beechcraft Bonanza
Bellanca Cruisemaster
Cessna 180
Cessna 182 Skylane
Cessna 187
Cessna 188
Cessna 310
DINFIA IA 53
Falconar SAL Mustang
Fanaero-Chile Chincol
Fuji KM-2
HAL Krishak
Maestranza Central de Aviación HF XX-02
Meyers 200
O-1 Bird dog
PZL-104 Wilga
SIAI-Marchetti FN.333 Riviera
St-Just Cyclone
Stinson 108 (modified under STC)
Taylorcraft Ranch Wagon
Yeoman Cropmaster

IO-470
Auster AOP.9
Beechcraft Baron
Beechcraft Bonanza
Cessna 185
Cessna 210A
Cessna 310
Meyers 200
Navion G Rangemaster
PAC Fletcher
Procaer Picchio
Ryan Navion
Aérotrain 01 – experimental hover train project

Specifications (O-470-11)

See also

References

Boxer engines
1950s aircraft piston engines
O-470